Stanislas Breton (3 June 1912 – 2 April 2005) was a French theologian and philosopher. He taught at the École Normale Supérieure in Paris, the Catholic University of Paris and the Catholic University of Lyon.
 
Stanislas Breton was born in Gradignan, and at the age of fifteen entered the Passionists as a novitiate. His doctoral thesis, under Raymond Aron, was on Nicolaï Hartmann. After teaching at the Pontifical University in Rome in the 1950s, Breton became Professor of Philosophy at the University of Lyons and then at the Catholic University of Paris. In 1970 he was appointed Maître de Conférence at the École Normale Supérieure: nominated by Louis Althusser, he was the first Catholic philosopher to obtain the post.

Works
 L'esse in et l'esse ad dans la métaphysique de la relation, Rome, 1951
 La Passion du Christ et les philosophies, Teramo: Eco, 1954
 Conscience et intentionalité, Paris-Lyon: Vitte, 1956
 Approches phénoménologiques de l'idée dêtre, Paris: E. Vitte, 1959
 Situation de la philosophie contemporaine, Paris: E. Vitte, 1959
 Essence et existence, Paris: Presses universitaires de France, 1962.
 L'être spirituel; recherches sur la philosophie de Nicolaï Hartmann, Lyon: E. Vitte, 1962.
 Mystique de la Passion, Tournai: Desclée, 1962
 Saint Thomas d'Aquin, Paris: Seghers, 1965
 Philosophie et mathématiques chez Proclus, Paris: Beauchesne, 1969
 Du Principe: l'organisation contemporaine de pensable, Paris: Aubier-Montaigne, 1971
 La Foi et raison logique, Paris: Éditions du Seuil, 1971
 Etre, monde, imaginaire, Paris: Seuil, 1976.
 Théorie des idéologies, Paris: Desclée, 1976
 Spinoza: théologie et politique, Paris: Desclée, 1977
 Ecriture et révélation, Paris: Editions du Cerf, 1979
 Le verbe et la croix, Paris: Desclée, 1981. Translated with an introduction by Jacquelyn Porter as The Word and the Cross, New York: Fordham University Press, 2002.
 Unicité et monothéisme, Paris: Éditions du Cerf, 1981.
 Deux mystiques de l'excès: J.-J. Surin et maître Eckhart, Paris: Cerf, 1985.
 Rien ou quelque chose: roman de métaphysique, Paris: Flammarion, 1987
 Poétique du sensible, Paris: Editions du Cerf, 1988
 Saint Paul, Paris: Presses universitaires de France, 1988. Translated by Joseph N. Bellan with an introduction by Ward Blanton as A Radical Philosophy of Saint Paul, New York: Columbia University Press, 2011.
 Matière et dispersion, Grenoble: J. Millon, 1993
 L’avenir du christianisme, Paris: Desclée de Brouwer, 1999

References

 
External links
 Stanislas Breton: Questioning the Essence of Christianity, Philosophy and Theology'' 16, 2004

1912 births
2005 deaths
20th-century French philosophers
20th-century French Catholic theologians
Academic staff of the École Normale Supérieure